Calbuco River may refer to:

Calbuco River (Cautín)
Calbuco River (Llanquihue)